Zhang Qibin (born 23 June 1994 in Zibo, Shandong) is a Chinese male swimmer. In the 2016 Olympics, Zhang swam the 100 m butterfly, placing 27th in the final with a time of 52.84 seconds.

References

External links 
 
 
 
 

1994 births
Living people
Male butterfly swimmers
Olympic swimmers of China
Swimmers at the 2016 Summer Olympics
Asian Games competitors for China
Swimmers at the 2014 Asian Games
Sportspeople from Zibo
Swimmers from Shandong
21st-century Chinese people